"Eagle When She Flies" is a song written and recorded by American country music artist Dolly Parton.  It was released in September 1991 as the third single from the album Eagle When She Flies.  The song reached number 33 on the Billboard Hot Country Singles & Tracks chart.

Chart performance

References

1991 songs
1991 singles
Dolly Parton songs
Songs written by Dolly Parton
Song recordings produced by Steve Buckingham (record producer)
Music videos directed by Mary Lambert
Columbia Records singles